The Independent is a newsmagazine published in Kampala, Uganda.

Overview
The newspaper covers general and business news. It also has dedicated sections for news analysis, Eastern African regional news and a features section. It comes out in glossy print, but it is also available on the Internet. It is published in English only.

History
The paper was founded in 2007, by Andrew Mwenda, who owns, edits and publishes the news magazine.

See also
 List of newspapers in Uganda
 Media in Uganda
 Andrew Mwenda
 Achola Rosario

References

External links
 Official website

Newspapers published in Uganda
Mass media in Kampala
Publications established in 2007
2007 establishments in Uganda